George W. Pyper (1886–1965) was an American screenwriter of the silent era. He was also a novelist. Pyper wrote the scripts for many productions made by FBO and Rayart Pictures, generally action films and westerns. He also worked on several serials for Universal Pictures.

Partial filmography

 The Branded Four (1920)
 The Vanishing Dagger (1920)
 The Diamond Queen (1921)
 Broad Daylight (1922)
 The Ghost City (1923)
 The Riddle Rider (1924)
 The Air Hawk (1924)
 The Fighting Ranger (1925)
 A Daughter of the Sioux (1925)
 Flyin' Thru (1925)
 The Riding Comet (1925)
 A Two-Fisted Sheriff (1925)
 Tonio, Son of the Sierras (1925)
 Riders of Mystery (1925)
 Scar Hanan (1925)
 Fort Frayne (1926)
 The Baited Trap (1926)
 A Captain's Courage (1926)
 Wolves of the Desert (1926)
 The Gallant Fool (1926)
 Avenging Fangs (1927)
 The Fighting Stallion (1927)
 Daring Deeds (1927)
 The Royal American (1927)
 The Silent Hero (1927)
 The Wheel of Destiny (1927)
 Heroes in Blue (1927)
 The Cruise of the Hellion (1927)
 The Racing Fool (1927)
 The City of Purple Dreams (1928)
 Into the Night (1928)
  Son of the Golden West (1928)
 Isle of Lost Men (1928)
 The Law's Lash (1928)
 Marlie the Killer (1928)
 All Faces West (1929)
 Outlawed (1929)
 The Drifter (1929)

References

External links

Bibliography
 George A. Katchmer. Eighty Silent Film Stars: Biographies and Filmographies of the Obscure to the Well Known. McFarland, 1991.
 Mavis, Paul. The Espionage Filmography: United States Releases, 1898 through 1999. McFarland and Company, 2001.

1886 births
1965 deaths
American screenwriters
People from Salt Lake City
20th-century American screenwriters